Lyckås is a manor house in Jönköping Municipality, Sweden.

History
Lyckås was at the beginning of the 17th century part of the estate of Per Brahe the Younger and remained part of a larger estate until 1751. In that year it was sold to G. J. Horn af Rantzien. It has subsequently belonged to various Swedish aristocratic families. The current main building is a two-story Renaissance-style stone house, built in 1863 at the direction of  Major General and  Count Jakob Essen Hamilton (1797-1864) and Stefanie Fredrika Hamilton (1819-1894).

References

Manor houses in Sweden